Potamochoeroides was an extinct genus of even-toed ungulates that existed during the Pliocene in South Africa.

References

Prehistoric Suidae
Pliocene mammals of Africa
Pliocene even-toed ungulates
Prehistoric even-toed ungulate genera